Alyssa Leonard is an American women’s lacrosse player. Having played with the Northwestern Wildcats women's lacrosse at the collegiate level, she was named to the US national team for the 2015-16 season. In 2016, she was selected by the Long Island Sound with their second pick overall in the inaugural United Women's Lacrosse League Draft. Leonard graduated from Northwestern as the NCAA draw control record holder.

Playing career

NCAA
On April 27, 2014, Leonard and the Northwestern lacrosse team hosted the University of Southern California Lady Trojans in a contest at historic Wrigley Field. With an attendance of 5,145 fans, the Wildcats prevailed by a final tally of 12-7. Leonard logged a hat trick while teammate Kara Mupo led the team with four goals scored.

UWLX
Competing in the first-ever game in the history of UWLX, at Goodman Stadium on the campus of Lehigh University, Leonard scored the game-winning goal as the Long Island Sound prevailed against Baltimore.
In the Sound’s second game, Leonard and Shannon Gilroy would each record hat tricks in a 14-8 final against Philadelphia.

Coaching career
After graduating from Northwestern, Leonard was hired as the offensive coordinator and assistant coach for the USC Lady Trojans. Working on the staff of head coach  Lindsey Munday, she replaced fellow Wildcats alum Hilary Bowen.

Awards and honors
American Lacrosse Conference Rookie of the Year
2013 Second-team All-ALC honoree 
2013 ALC All-Tournament Team selection 
2014 First-team All-ALC honoree 
2014 ALC All-Tournament Team selection 
2014 Second-team IWLCA All-American
2014 First-team IWLCA All-West Region honoree 
2014 NCAA All-Tournament Team  
2014 Big Ten Athlete of the Year Nominee
 2014 Female Athlete of the Year Northwestern University
2016 UWLX All-Star Selection

References

Living people
American lacrosse players
Northwestern Wildcats women's lacrosse players
Year of birth missing (living people)